The modern pentathlon at the 1976 Summer Olympics was represented by two events (both for men): Individual competition and Team competition. As usual in Olympic modern pentathlon, one competition was held and each competitor's score was included to the Individual competition event results table and was also added to his teammates' scores to be included to the Team competition event results table. This competition consisted of 5 disciplines:

Equestrian, held on July 18 at Bromont.
Fencing, held on July 19 at Université de Montréal. 
Shooting, held on July 20 at L'Acadie.
Swimming, held on July 21 at Olympic Pool.
Cross-country, held on July 22 at Olympic Stadium and Maisonneuve Park.

Results

The   were forced to scratch from the competition after team member Boris Onischenko was ejected for cheating.

The other Soviet team members, Pavel Lednev and Boris Mosolov, were allowed to continue individually, but since three athletes are required to compete in a team event, it was ruled their results received no score in the team competition.

References

External links
Official Olympic Report

1976 Summer Olympics events
1976